Bado may refer to:

People
Bado (cartoonist), a Canadian cartoonist
Joris Bado, a Burkinabé professional basketball player

Religion
Bado, a religious ceremony in Dogon religion

Places
Ələsgərli, Shamkir, a village in Azerbaijan formerly called Bado (or Badakand)
Bado, Burkina Faso, a village in Burkina Faso
Bado, Missouri, a community in the United States